Events from the year 1878 in Ireland.

Events
 22 May – launch of the experimental powered submarine Holland I, designed by Irish-born John Philip Holland, at Paterson, New Jersey. Its performance impresses the American Fenian Brotherhood sufficiently to induce them to finance his continued experiments with a view to using such a machine against the British.
 24 August – the narrow gauge Ballymena and Larne Railway starts passenger operations in County Antrim, the first on the Irish 3 ft narrow gauge.
 9 October – St Mary's Cathedral, Tuam (Church of Ireland) dedicated.
 28 September – Intermediate Education Act passed: this will revolutionise Irish society, as it provides education to talented and hard-working boys and girls through "Exhibitions" (scholarships) worth up to $50. It particularly changes the position of women: by 1901 there will be 20,478 teachers in Ireland, 60% of them women, earning 80% of the male wage for the job.
 Mount St. Joseph Abbey, Roscrea established by Cistercian Trappist monks from Mount Melleray Abbey.
 Public Health (Ireland) Act 1878 introduces laws regarding sanitary districts.
 Mageough Home opens in Rathmines.

Arts and literature
The Kerry Sentinel newspaper begins publication in Tralee.
Oscar Wilde leaves Ireland permanently.

Sport
 Irish Cycling Association (ICA) was established to administer the cycling as the sport became popular throughout Ireland.

Births
8 January – Frederic Charles Dreyer, Royal Navy Admiral (died 1956).
1 February – Thomás MacDonagh, nationalist, poet, rebel and Easter Rising leader (executed 1916).
14 February – Daniel Corkery, writer, teacher and Fianna Fáil Senator (died 1964).
23 February – Pádraic Ó Máille, Sinn Féin MP and TD, Fianna Fáil Senator (died 1946).
13 March – Patrick McCartan, Sinn Féin MP and TD, member of 1st Dáil, a founder member of Clann na Poblachta (died 1966).
19 March – Michael James O'Rourke, soldier, recipient of the Victoria Cross for gallantry in 1917 at Hill 70 near Lens, France (died 1957).
31 March – Jamesy Kelleher, Cork hurler (died 1943).
11 April – Kathleen Clarke, née Daly, wife of Tom Clarke, Sinn Féin and later Fianna Fáil TD, Seanad member, first female Lord Mayor of Dublin (died 1972).
17 April – Thomas Harvey, cricketer and rugby player (died 1966).
3 June – Sinéad de Valera, née Ní Fhlannagáin, writer and wife of third President of Ireland, Éamon de Valera (died 1975).
12 June – Geoffrey Taylour, 4th Marquess of Headfort, peer (died 1943).
24 July – Edward Plunkett, 18th Baron Dunsany, writer and dramatist (died 1957).
9 August – Eileen Gray, architect and designer (died 1976).
15 August – Harry Corley, cricketer and rugby union international (died 1936).
17 August – Oliver St. John Gogarty, physician, poet and writer (died 1957).
24 August – Margaret Mary Pearse, Fianna Fáil TD and Seanad Éireann member, sister of Patrick Pearse (died 1968).
28 October – Helena Concannon, Fianna Fáil politician and historian (died 1952).
7 November – Margaret Cousins, née Gillespie, teacher, suffragist and Theosophist (died 1954 in India).
27 November – William Orpen, painter (died 1931).
23 December – Francis Sheehy-Skeffington, suffragist, pacifist and writer (murdered by British Army 1916).
30 December – Dick Walsh, Kilkenny hurler (died 1958).

Deaths
22 March – Henry MacManus, artist (born c.1810)
2 April – William Clements, 3rd Earl of Leitrim, nobleman and landowner (born 1806).
22 September – Sir Richard John Griffith, 1st Baronet, geologist (born 1784).
24 October – Paul Cullen, Cardinal and Catholic Primate of Ireland (born 1803).
4 December – Richard Smyth, Presbyterian minister, academic and politician (born 1826).
22 December – Patrick Mylott, soldier, recipient of the Victoria Cross for gallantry in 1857 in India (born 1820).
Full date unknown – Charles Anderson Read, journalist, novelist and anthologist (born 1841).

References

 
1870s in Ireland
Ireland
Years of the 19th century in Ireland
 Ireland